SS Sackett's Harbor was a T2 tanker that was built in August 1943. She served in the United States Merchant Marine during World War II. The ship was a namesake of Sackets Harbor, New York.

Sackett's Harbor survived the war basically unscathed but on 1 March 1946 she was sailing between Yokosuka and Balboa when she broke in half about 800 miles southwest of Adak, Alaska.  The bow of the ship was sunk but the stern continued to float. The stern section was able to get to Adak under her own power. The only reported fatalities were two cats.

Power plant
The ship was later towed to Anchorage, Alaska where she served as Anchorage's first major power source.  The ship's electric drive supplied about 55% of Anchorage's electricity requirements from 1946 to 1955.  In 1955, she was replaced by the Eklutna Dam.

New bow
The ship was given a new bow around 1957 and was rechristened as the SS Angelo Petri.  She was fitted with stainless steel tanks and hauled wine for the Associated Vintners from Stockton, California through the Panama Canal to the East Coast.

She was renamed Californian in 1970, and then Sea Chemist in 1975 when she was sold to Antilles Navegacion S.A., of Panama. She was sold for scrapping in early 1978 and was broken up at Vinaròs.

References

External links
armed-guard.com
Anchorage Municipal Light and Power
westcoastwine.net

1943 ships
1946 in Alaska
Maritime incidents in 1946
Ships built in Portland, Oregon
Shipwrecks of the Alaska coast
Type T2-SE-A1 tankers
World War II tankers of the United States